Alfred Moses (July 4, 1977 – July 26, 2022) was a Canadian politician, who was elected to the Legislative Assembly of the Northwest Territories in the 2011 election. He represented the electoral district of Inuvik Boot Lake until his retirement from politics in 2019.  

Moses died on July 26, 2022 at the age of 45.

References

1977 births
2022 deaths
Members of the Executive Council of the Northwest Territories
Members of the Legislative Assembly of the Northwest Territories
First Nations politicians
People from Inuvik
21st-century Canadian politicians